Chalcosyrphus eumerus is a species of Hoverfly in the family Syrphidae.

Distribution
Russia.

References

Eristalinae
Insects described in 1869
Diptera of Asia
Taxa named by Hermann Loew